Chiryashtamak (Siräştamaq) is a rural locality (a village) in Bogdanovsky Selsoviet, Miyakinsky District, Bashkortostan, Russia. The population was 132 as of 2010. There are 4 streets.

Geography 
Chiryashtamak is located 20 km west of Kirgiz-Miyaki (the district's administrative centre) by road. Kanbekovo is the nearest rural locality.

References 

Rural localities in Miyakinsky District